Artworks commemorating African-Americans in Washington, D.C. is a group of fourteen public artworks in Washington, D.C., including the Martin Luther King, Jr. Memorial dedicated in 2011, that commemorate African Americans. When describing thirteen of these that predate the King Memorial, Jacqueline Trescott wrote for The Washington Post:  Trescott reported that four additional commemorative works also include representations of African Americans.

List
Trescott reported that the following works commemorate African Americans.
https://en.wikipedia.org/wiki/Octavius_Catto
 A. Philip Randolph bust, by Ed Dwight, in Union Station
 Emancipation Memorial, by Thomas Ball featuring Abraham Lincoln and a newly freed slave, in Lincoln Park
 (Here I Stand) In the Spirit of Paul Robeson, by Allen Uzikee Nelson, Petworth neighborhood, at the intersection of Georgia Avenue, Varnum Street, and Kansas Avenue
Josh Gibson, full-size statue, Omri Amrany and Julie Rotblatt-Amrany. Nationals Park
 Lady Fortitude, by James King, at Howard University
 Dr. King bust by John Wilson, in the United States Capitol Rotunda
Mary McLeod Bethune Memorial, by Robert Berks, life-sized statue, Lincoln Park
 Negro Mother and Child, by Maurice Glickman, in the basement courtyard of the Interior Department, C Street and 18th Street, N.W.
 Spirit of Freedom: African American Civil War Memorial, by Ed Hamilton, at 10th Street and U Street, N.W.
 Bust of Sojourner Truth, by Artis Lane, in the Capitol Visitor Center
 Saint Martin de Porres statue, by Thomas McGlynn, Our Lady of Perpetual Help Catholic Church, 1600 Morris Road, S.E.
 The Progress of the Negro Race, by Daniel Gillette Olney, a terra cotta frieze, Langston Terrace Dwellings, 21st Street and Benning Road N.E.
 The Shaw Memorial, by Augustus Saint-Gaudens, patinated plaster cast for a sculpture, National Gallery of Art. The cast's inscription reads: ROBERT GOULD SHAW – KILLED WHILE LEADING THE ASSAVLT ON FORT WAGNER JVLY TWENTY THIRD EIGHTEEN HVNDRED AND SIXTY THREE.

Additional representations of African Americans
Trescott reported that the following memorials contain additional representations of African Americans.

The Vietnam Veterans Memorial, by Frederick E. Hart.
The Korean War Veterans Memorial, by Frank Gaylord II.
The Franklin Delano Roosevelt Memorial, overall design by Lawrence Halprin.
The Vietnam Women's Memorial, by Glenna Goodacre.

Photo gallery

See also

Rosa Parks (National Statuary Hall)
Frederick Douglass (Capitol Building)
Marion Barry (Washington City Council Building)
Cornerstones of History
List of African-American historic places in the District of Columbia

African American:
 List of museums focused on African Americans
 List of streets named after Martin Luther King Jr.

References

External links
Flickr photo of "Lady Fortitude"
Photos of and information regarding Mary McLeod Bethune Memorial (info from Smithsonian)
Flickr photo of Josh Gibson statue
Photos of and information regarding the sculpture, "Negro mother and child" (info from Smithsonian)
Photos of and information regarding St. Martin de Porres sculpture (info from Smithsonian)
Photos of and information regarding the sculpture, "The progress of the Negro race" (info from Smithsonian)
Flickr photo of A. Philip Randolph bust
Fifteen photographs of Franklin Delano Roosevelt Memorial by Jennifer Rosenberg, About.com
Ramanathan, Lavanya, "Eye Opening Artifacts of Black History", The Washington Post, January 27, 2012
Helm, Joe, "On Emancipation Day in D.C., Two Memorials Tell Very Different Stories", The Washington Post, April 15, 2012

African-American history of Washington, D.C.
African American-related lists
Commemorating African Americans
Outdoor sculptures in Washington, D.C.